The Honda CBR600F is a CBR series  four-cylinder sport bike made by Honda. The first model of the CBR600F was sold from 1987 to 1990 and is known in the US as the Hurricane. In Austria and Mexico, a smaller version, called CBR500F, was offered. The subsequent models are designated as CBR600F2, F3, F4 and F4i respectively. In 2011, Honda released a more modern model with the same name.

The original CBR600F along with the CBR750F and CBR1000F was Honda's first inline four-cylinder, fully-faired sport bike. The style was said to be influenced by a brief European trend toward a smooth and completely enclosed fairing such as in the Ducati Paso.



History

CBR600F2 (1991–1994) 

The CBR600F2 was made from 1991 to 1994. It was introduced to replace the original CBR600F Hurricane and was considered one of Honda's most modern and innovative sport bikes. Development of the CBR600F2 began in early 1989. Hurricane LPL Ishikawa led the development of the new bike, known internally as MV9 but also called the F2, an alphanumeric that led to its official name: CBR600F2.

The F2's development began with meetings to discuss concepts and sketches for the new bike. A few months later, an F2 prototype was produced. Painted black, the bike looked faster and sleeker than the more blocky first generation bike and test results were superior: few motorcycles in the 1990s had the performance ability of the F2.

CBR600F3 (1995–1998) 

The CBR600F3 is the third generation of the CBR600F series. It replaced the F2, and was produced from 1995 to 1998. It had a modified engine, ram-air intake and cartridge forks. The 1997 and 1998 models also came with a deeper oil pan, sleeker tail fairings, seat and taillight, and a revised engine head netting about a  gain over 1995–1996 models. The CDI and ram-air system were also revised to allowed for smoother throttle curve over the 1995–1996 models, which could sometimes be jerky. The last made 1998 models came with another revised engine head which resulted in a slight power gain. In 1999, it was replaced by the CBR600F4.

In 1996 and 1998, the F3 was also sold in "Smokin' Joe's Replica" versions in the US, Canada and Australia (1998 only).

CBR600F4 (1999–2000) 

The CBR600F4 was produced between 1999 and 2000. It is the last of the CBR600 series of Honda sport bikes to be carbureted. An aluminium twin-spar frame which reduced frame weight was used, and the engine crankcase was designed to share the swingarm pivot. Through a reduction of internal friction and weight, combined with larger valves, shorter stroke and a bigger bore, higher revs were enabled. The spark plug caps had ignition coils built into them. Slightly larger carbs were added and the oil cooler was now located by the oil filter. A new suspension had larger  forks and used Fireblade parts. The F4 is fitted with Honda's HISS engine immobilizer system.

The phrase "Dedicated to Super Evaluators Dirk Vandenberg and Josef Boyd" are embossed in raised letters on the inside of the F4's upper fairing; the dedication to two of Honda R&D's senior product developers who were killed during the final testing of this model.

CBR600F4i (2001–2006) 

The CBR600F4i was produced from 2001 to 2006. The upgraded F4i is a modified F4 with numerous engine, chassis and bodywork changes.

The 2001 US F4i had a new subframe which raises the seat by  that allows for more storage room and improved two-tier seat. The new tail unit has less padding and a higher perch for the passenger. The F4i's taillight is smaller with a new dual-bulb configuration. The F4i had a new dash layout with a large analog tachometer. The new LCD digital display had a speedometer, odometer, clock, engine temperature read-out, amber shift light and trip meters. The single largest change aside from the styling is the addition of high-pressure  PGM-FI (programmed fuel injection) system — thus the model designation "F4i". In a number of countries, the bike was sold in both the "normal" and "Sport" variants, the Sport having a two-part seat, no grab rail and no main stand (though the main stand mounting holes remained). Fuel injection allows for more precise fuel metering and delivery over a wider rpm range, while providing better throttle response and reducing emissions. The injectors reside one per cylinder and work with  throttle bodies.

The weight of the wheels was reduced. The rotor carriers moved out closer to the brake calipers to reduce weight and to improve rigidity.  But stopping power still was not on par with other bikes in the class. There is additional bracing on the steering head for more response, better feedback and feel from the front end. The suspension has also been tweaked with less high-speed damping and a little more low-speed damping with the shock and fork being more street-bias.

Additional engine changes include a lighter camshaft sprocket and increased valve spring pressure (two springs per intake valve) which allow for higher revving. There are new piston rings that slide with less friction and increased internal engine oil flow. Redline is now 14,200 rpm, 700 rpm higher than the previous year's F4. To increase the bike's pulling capabilities at high speeds, the fifth and sixth gears have been shortened slightly and the rear sprocket was enlarged from 45 teeth to 46, also adding one clutch plate for greater durability to now making 8. Spring pressures on the intake and exhaust valves have been increased to avoid valve float. Also, there are now two valve springs (inner and outer) on the intake side instead of the single item that resides on the exhaust side.

The F4i's new bodywork carries a more racy look and provides a 3% reduction in drag. It also houses a new dual headlight front cowl design which uses 40% brighter H7 bulbs compared to the old H4 bulbs. The headlights are dual multi-reflector units covered by a one-piece flexiglass lens. The turn stalks are shorter and the mirrors are now positioned higher and closer to the rider. The elimination of carburetors allowed for a slightly larger air box and a larger  fuel tank.

In 2001 and 2002, in recognition of Honda's association with MotoGP champion Valentino Rossi and its 500th motorcycle Grand Prix victory, the CBR600F4i was also released in Europe and Australia (2001 & 2002 only) in two "Rossi Replica" versions.

CBR600F (2011–2013) 

In 2011, Honda released the new CBR600F model built in Italy for the European markets that was not released in America. It continues the legacy of the CBR-F line. To honor the German rider Stefan Bradl, Honda Germany launched a special edition of the CBR600F, called CBR600F LCR. It featured an Arrow titanium exhaust, Progrip handlebar grips, a rear hugger, single seat cover and an LCR sticker kit as well as combined braking and ABS. It is wrapped in a multi-layered full fairing that lowers drag and protects the rider from windblast as well as new instruments, bars and tank. It also retains a similar relaxed seating position to minimise rider fatigue. The 2011 CBR600F also shares the engine of the highly revised CB600F model that came out in April 2007.

Specifications
All specifications are claimed by the manufacturer unless otherwise specified.

References

External links 

MCN News AU: Honda CBR600 history video
CBR600F3 Introduction at motorcycle.com
 Honda CBR600F Review Honda CBR motorcycle road test
 2006 CBR600F4i Review 2006 Honda CBR 600 F4i Sport Bike Motorcycle

CBR600F
Sport bikes
Motorcycles introduced in 1987